Austin shooting may refer to:

 1966 Tower shooting at The University of Texas at Austin (Charles Whitman)
 2021 Austin shooting